Abee is a hamlet in Alberta, Canada within Thorhild County.

History 

The hamlet was named for A.B. Donley, lumber company manager. Harry Buryn found the Abee meteorite, which is only example in the world of an EH4 impact-melt breccia meteorite, in June 1952 in his wheat field.

Demographics 
The population of Abee according to the 2009 municipal census conducted by Thorhild County is 27.

See also 
List of communities in Alberta
List of hamlets in Alberta

References 

Hamlets in Alberta
Thorhild County